David L. Calhoun (born April 18, 1957) is an American businessman who has been president and chief executive officer (CEO) of The Boeing Company since January 2020. He was previously Boeing's chairman and was appointed president and CEO after his predecessor Dennis Muilenburg was fired amidst safety concerns regarding the 737 MAX after two fatal crashes that claimed the lives of 346 passengers and crew on board.

Early life and education
Calhoun was born April 18, 1957 in Philadelphia and grew up in Allentown, Pennsylvania. He attended Parkland High School in South Whitehall Township, Pennsylvania, graduating in 1975. In high school, Calhoun was one of three captains of the varsity basketball team and played golf. He attended Virginia Tech, graduating in 1979 with a degree in accounting.

Career
After Calhoun graduated from college, he gained employment at General Electric (GE). He decided to work for GE at that time, due to its close proximity to where he lived in Lehigh Valley. He worked at GE for 26 years, overseeing transportation, aircraft engines, reinsurance, lighting and other GE units, before ultimately being appointed as vice chairman of the company and a member of GE's Board of Directors in 2005.

Calhoun left GE to join privately held global information services firm VNU as CEO in 2006. Under his leadership the company rebranded itself as Nielsen Holdings, returned to the public markets in 2011, and was added to the S&P 500 Index in 2013. In 2014, Calhoun became executive chairman of Nielsen, and also joined The Blackstone Group as a senior managing director and head of portfolio operations and a member of Blackstone's management committee. Blackstone had been one of six private equity firms that backed Nielsen's transformation. During his career, Calhoun was on the board of directors of Caterpillar, Gates Corporation, and Medtronic.

Boeing
Since 2009, Calhoun has served as a director at Boeing, and was named lead independent director in 2018, and on December 23, 2019, he stepped down as chairman in preparation for becoming Boeing's CEO and president, effective January 13, 2020.

In a March 2020 interview with The New York Times, Calhoun discussed the 737 MAX's MCAS software, saying the Boeing had made a "fatal mistake" in expecting that pilots could immediately correct the software problems. He went on to explain that "pilots [in Ethiopia and Indonesia] don't have anywhere near the experience that they have here in the U.S."; he unsuccessfully requested to go off the record after being asked whether American pilots would have been able to control the situation, and then replied, "[f]orget it, you can guess the answer."

In 2020, Boeing had a historically bad year, reporting a $12 billion loss and laying off 30,000 workers. At the same time, Calhoun earned $21.1 million in compensation.

Philanthropy 
In 2018, Calhoun gave $20 million to Virginia Tech to create the Calhoun Honors Discovery Program.

References

American chief executives of financial services companies
Living people
Virginia Tech alumni
Businesspeople from Philadelphia
Parkland High School (Pennsylvania) alumni
1957 births
Boeing people
General Electric people
20th-century American businesspeople
21st-century American businesspeople